Carystoterpa fingens, commonly known as the variegated spittlebug, is a spittlebug of the family Aphrophoridae. It is endemic to New Zealand. It was first described by Francis Walker in 1851.

References

Aphrophoridae
Hemiptera of New Zealand
Endemic fauna of New Zealand
Insects described in 1851
Taxa named by Francis Walker (entomologist)
Endemic insects of New Zealand